Biri Travbane is a harness racing track located at Biri in Gjøvik, Norway. Owned by Norwegian Trotting Association, its tote betting is handled by Norsk Rikstoto. The venue opened in 1985.

References

External links
 Official website

Sports venues in Gjøvik
Harness racing venues in Norway
Sports venues completed in 1985
1985 establishments in Norway